Sandrine Testud was the defending champion but lost in the first round to Barbara Rittner.

Patty Schnyder won in the final 6–1, 5–7, 6–2 against Barbara Schett.

Seeds
A champion seed is indicated in bold text while text in italics indicates the round in which that seed was eliminated.

  Patty Schnyder (champion)
  Sandrine Testud (first round)
  Magüi Serna (first round)
  Barbara Schett (final)
  Rita Grande (second round)
  Miriam Oremans (semifinals)
  Sylvia Plischke (first round)
  Tatiana Panova (first round)

Draw

External links
 1998 Internazionali Femminili di Palermo Draw

Internazionali Femminili di Palermo
1998 WTA Tour